Jiangxi (formerly romanized as Kiangsi or Chianghsi) is a landlocked province in the east of the People's Republic of China. Its major cities include Nanchang and Jiujiang. Spanning from the banks of the Yangtze river in the north into hillier areas in the south and east, it shares a border with Anhui to the north, Zhejiang to the northeast, Fujian to the east, Guangdong to the south, Hunan to the west, and Hubei to the northwest.

The name "Jiangxi" is derived from the circuit administrated under the Tang dynasty in 733, Jiangnanxidao (Gan: Kongnomsitau). The abbreviation for Jiangxi is "" (Gan: Gōm), for the Gan River which runs across from the south to the north and flows into the Yangtze River. Jiangxi is also alternately called Ganpo Dadi which literally means the "Great Land of Gan and Po".

After the fall of the Qing dynasty, Jiangxi became one of the earliest bases for the Communists and many peasants were recruited to join the growing people's revolution. The Nanchang Uprising took place in Jiangxi on August 1, 1927, during the Chinese Civil War. Later the Communist leadership hid in the mountains of southern and western Jiangxi, hiding from the Kuomintang's attempts to eradicate them. In 1931, the Chinese Soviet Republic's government was established in Ruijin, which is sometimes called the "Former Red Capital" (Gan: Fūng-set Kū-tu), or just the "Red Capital". In 1935, after complete encirclement by the Nationalist forces, the Communists broke through and began the Long March to Yan'an.

The southern half of Jiangxi is hilly and mountainous, with ranges and valleys interspersed; notable mountains and mountain ranges include Mountain Lu, the Jinggang Mountains and Mount Sanqing. The northern half is comparatively lower in altitude. The Gan River flows through the province.

Although the majority of Jiangxi's population is Han Chinese, Jiangxi is linguistically diverse. It is considered the center of Gan Chinese; Hakka Chinese, is also spoken to some degree. Jiangxi is rich in mineral resources, leading the provinces of China in deposits of copper, tungsten, gold, silver, uranium, thorium, tantalum, and niobium.

History

Jiangxi is centered on the Gan River valley, which historically provided the main north–south transport route of south China. The corridor along the Gan River is one of the few easily traveled routes through the otherwise mountainous and rugged terrain of the south-eastern mountains. This open corridor was the primary route for trade and communication between the North China Plain and the Yangtze River valley in the north and the territory of modern Guangdong province in the south. As a result, Jiangxi has been strategically important throughout much of China's history.

Jiangxi was outside the sphere of influence of early Chinese civilization during the Shang dynasty (16th to 11th centuries BC). It is likely that peoples collectively known as the Baiyue inhabited the region. During the Spring and Autumn period, the northern part of modern Jiangxi formed the western frontier of the state of Wu. After Wu was conquered by the state of Yue (a power based in modern northern Zhejiang) in 473 BC, the state of Chu (based in modern Hubei) took over northern Jiangxi and there may have been some Yue influence in the south. Chu subjugated Yue in 333 BC. In 223 BC, when Qin conquered Chu, a majority of the Jiangxi area was recorded to be put under Jiujiang Commandary situated in Shouchun. However the commandary was ineffective and ended shortly when Qin falls.

Yuzhang Commandery (Gan: Ì-zong) was established in Jiangxi at the beginning of the Han dynasty, possibly before the death of Xiang Yu in 202 BC, and it's also the very first commandery set up by Chinese dynasty in Jiangxi. It was named after the Yuzhang River (Gan: Ì-zong Kong), the original name of Gan River. "Gan" has become the abbreviation of the province. In 201, eight counties were added to the original seven of Qin, and three more were established in later years. Throughout most of the Han dynasty the commandery's eighteen counties covered most of the modern province of Jiangxi. The county seats of Nanchang, Gan, Yudu, Luling among others were located at the sites of modern major cities. Other counties, however, have been moved or abolished in later centuries.

Under the reign of Emperor Wu of the Han dynasty, Yuzhang Commandery was assigned to Yangzhou Province, as part of a trend to establish provinces (zhou) all across China. In 291 AD, during the Western Jin dynasty, Jiangxi became its own Zhou called Jiangzhou (Gan: Kong-chiu). During the Southern and Northern Dynasties, Jiangxi was under the control of the southern dynasties, and the number of zhou slowly grew.

During the Sui dynasty, there were seven commanderies and twenty-four counties in Jiangxi. During the Tang dynasty, another commandery and fourteen counties were added. Commanderies were then abolished, becoming zhou (henceforth translated as "prefectures" rather than "provinces").

Circuits were established during the Tang dynasty as a new top-level administrative division. At first Jiangxi was part of the Jiangnan Circuit (lit. "Circuit south of the Yangtze"). In 733, this circuit was divided into western and eastern halves. Jiangxi was found in the western half, which was called Jiangnanxi Circuit (lit. "Western circuits south of the Yangtze"). This is the source of the modern name "Jiangxi".

The Tang dynasty collapsed in 907, heralding the division of the Five Dynasties and Ten Kingdoms period. Jiangxi first belonged to Wu (Gan: Ng), then to Southern Tang (Gan: Nām-thóng). Both states were based in modern-day Nanjing, further down the Yangtze River.

During the Song dynasty, Jiangnanxi Circuit was reestablished with nine prefectures and four army districts (with sixty-eight districts).

During the Yuan dynasty, the circuit was divided into thirteen different circuits, and Jiangxi Province was established for the first time. This province also included the majority of modern Guangdong. Jiangxi acquired (more or less) its modern borders during the Ming dynasty after Guangdong was separated out. There has been little change to the borders of Jiangxi since.

After the fall of the Qing dynasty, Jiangxi became one of the earliest bases for the Communists and many peasants were recruited to join the growing people's revolution. The Nanchang Uprising took place in Jiangxi on August 1, 1927, during the Chinese Civil War. Later the Communist leadership hid in the mountains of southern and western Jiangxi, hiding from the Kuomintang's attempts to eradicate them. In 1931, the Chinese Soviet Republic's government was established in Ruijin, which is sometimes called the "Former Red Capital" (Gan: Fūng-set Kū-tu), or just the "Red Capital". In 1935, after complete encirclement by the Nationalist forces, the Communists broke through and began the Long March to Yan'an.

From 1930 to 1934, the National Government carried out five military campaigns against the Jiangxi Soviet area. Its brutal two-party battles and cleansing (including the internal cleansing of the Red Army and the cleaning of the post-war government) caused a large number of deaths or escapes, causing the population of Jiangxi to drop by 40%, until only 13.8 million people were left in 1936.

In 1936, after the opening of the Yuehan Railway in Hunan, Jiangxi lost its important position regarding north–south traffic. In 1937, the east-west Zhegan Railway was opened to traffic, which changed the original traffic patterns in Jiangxi to a large extent. The Jiujiang Port began to decline in importance.

Following the Doolittle Raid during World War II, most of the B-25 American crews that came down in China eventually made it to safety with the help of Chinese civilians and soldiers. The Chinese people who helped them, however, paid dearly for sheltering the Americans. The Imperial Japanese Army began the Zhejiang-Jiangxi Campaign to intimidate the Chinese from helping downed American airmen. The Japanese killed an estimated 250,000 civilians of China while searching for Doolittle's men.

Geography

Mountains surround Jiangxi on three sides, with the Mufu Mountains, Jiuling Mountains, and Luoxiao Mountains on the west; Huaiyu Mountains and Wuyi Mountains on the east; and the Jiulian Mountains and Dayu Mountains in the south. The southern half of the province is hilly with ranges and valleys interspersed; while the northern half is flatter and lower in altitude. The highest point in Jiangxi is Mount Huanggang in the Wuyi Mountains, on the border with Fujian.

The Gan River dominates the province, flowing through the entire length of the province from south to north. It enters Lake Poyang in the north, the largest freshwater lake of China; that lake in turn empties into the Yangtze River, which forms part of the northern border of Jiangxi. Important reservoirs include the Xiushui Tuolin Reservoir in the northwest of the province on the Xiushui River, and the Wan'an Reservoir(zh) in the upper section of the Gan.

Jiangxi has a humid subtropical climate (Cfa under the Köppen climate classification), with short, cool, damp winters, and very hot, humid summers.

Nanchang, the provincial capital and the most densely populated city, is one of the largest Chinese metropolises. Nanchang is the hub of Jiangxi civilization throughout its history, which plays a leading role in the commercial, intellectual and industrial and political fields. Ganzhou is the largest subdivision of Jiangxi.

Major cities in Jiangxi include:
 Nanchang
 Jiujiang

Administrative divisions

Jiangxi is divided into eleven prefecture-level divisions: all prefecture-level cities:

These prefecture-level cities are in turn subdivided into 100 county-level divisions (23 districts, 11 county-level cities, and 66 counties). Those in turn are divided into 1548 township-level divisions (770 towns, 651 townships, seven ethnic townships, and 120 subdistricts).

See List of administrative divisions of Jiangxi for a complete list of county-level divisions.

Urban areas

Politics

The Politics of Jiangxi is structured in a dual party-government system like all other governing institutions in mainland China.

The Governor of Jiangxi is the highest-ranking official in the People's Government of Jiangxi. However, in the province's dual party-government governing system, the Governor has less power than the Jiangxi Chinese Communist Party Provincial Committee Secretary, colloquially termed the "Jiangxi CPC Party Chief".

Economy
Rice is the dominant crop in Jiangxi. Cash crops commonly grown include cotton and rapeseed. Jiangxi is the leading producer of kumquats in China, particularly Suichuan County.

Jiangxi is rich in mineral resources, leading the provinces of China in deposits of copper, tungsten, gold, silver, uranium, thorium, tantalum, niobium, among others. Noted centers of mining include Dexing (copper) and Dayu County (tungsten).

It is located in extreme proximity to some of the richest provinces of China (Guangdong, Zhejiang, Fujian), which are sometimes blamed for taking away talent and capital from Jiangxi.

Jiangxi has the lowest wages and third lowest property prices in all of China., As of 2016 Jiangxi's nominal GDP was CNY 1.84 trillion or US$276.48 billion, and a per capita of CNY 40,400 or US$6,082.

Economic and technological development zones
Nanchang Export Processing Zone
Nanchang National Export Expressing Zone is located in NanChang Hi-Tech Industrial Development Zone, it was approved by the State Council on May 8, 2006, and passed the national acceptance inspection on Sep 7th, 2007. It enjoys simple and convenient customs clearances, and special preferential policies both for Nanchang National Export Expressing Zone and NCHDZ.
Nanchang National High-tech Industrial Development Zone
Nanchang National High-tech Industrial Development Zone (NCHDZ for short hereafter) is the only national grade high-tech zoned in Jiangxi, it was established in Mar. 1991. NCHDZ possesses unique nature condition and sound industry foundation of accepting electronics industry. NCHDZ has brought 25% industrial added value and 50% industrial benefit and tax to Nanchang city by using only 0.4% land area.
Nanchang Economic and Technological Development Zone
 Jiujiang Free Trade(Tariff-free) Zone
 Jiujiang National Economical and Technological Development Zone
 Jiujiang Gongqingcheng National High-tech Industrial Development Zone

Demographics

The population of Jiangxi is approximately 39.66 million.  99.73% of that is Han Chinese, predominantly Gan and Hakka. Ganzhou, Jiangxi's largest city, has an especially large number of Hakka. Ethnic minorities include She.

Jiangxi and Henan both have the most unbalanced gender ratios of all Chinese provinces. Based on a 2009 British Medical Journal study, the ratio is over 140 boys for every 100 girls in the 1-4 age group.

In 2019 the most-common surname in Jiangxi was Liú (刘), the only province where this was the case. Overall Liu is the fourth-most common surname in the country.

Religion 

The predominant religions in Jiangxi are Chinese folk religions, Taoist traditions and Chinese Buddhism. According to surveys conducted in 2007 and 2009, 24.05% of the population believes and is involved in ancestor veneration, while 2.31% of the population identifies as Christian.

The reports didn't give figures for other types of religion; 73.64% of the population may be either irreligious or involved in worship of nature deities, Buddhism, Confucianism, Taoism, folk religious sects.

Culture

Jiangxi is the main area of concentration of the Gan varieties of Chinese, spoken over most of the northern two-thirds of the province. Examples include the Nanchang dialect, Yichun dialect and Ji'an dialect. The southern one-third of the province speaks Hakka. There are also Mandarin, Huizhou, and Wu dialects spoken along the northern border.

Ganju (Jiangxi opera) is the type of Chinese opera performed in Jiangxi.

Although little known outside of the province, Jiangxi cuisine is rich and distinctive. Flavors are some of the strongest in China, with heavy use of chili peppers and especially pickled and fermented products.

Jingdezhen is widely regarded as the producer of the best porcelain in China.

Jiangxi also was a historical center of Chan Buddhism.

Prominent examples of Hakka architecture can be found in Jiangxi.

Transportation
As of January 2015, Jiangxi had two Yangtze River crossings, both in Jiujiang.

Rail
The Beijing–Kowloon Railway and Shanghai–Kunming Railway crisscross the province and intersect at Nanchang, which also has a high-speed rail link to Jiujiang. In addition, Jiangxi is connected by rail to Anhui Province via the Anhui–Jiangxi and Tongling–Jiujiang Railways; to Hubei via the Wuhan–Jiujiang Railway; and to Fujian via the Yingtan–Xiamen, Hengfeng–Nanping, Ganzhou–Longyan and Xiangtang–Putian Railways.

Tourism

There are several famous mountains in Jiangxi Province, including Mountain Lu in Jiujiang, Mount jinggang at the border of jiangxi province and Hunan province, Mount Sanqing in Yushan county.

Near the northern port city of Jiujiang lies the well-known resort area of Mountain Lu. Also near the city is the Donglin Temple , one important Buddhist temple in china.

Near the small city of Yingtan is the resort area of Longhushan, which purports to be the birthplace of Taoism and hence has great symbolic value to Taoists. The region has many temples, cave complexes, mountains and villages.

The Mountain Lu National Park has been a UNESCO World Heritage Site since 1996.

Kuling located on the top of Mountain Lu is a summer resort developed by European in the 19th century. There were 3000 European living in Kuling, Mountain Lu, Jiujiang in summer time in 1920 s.

In 2007, Jiangxi (specifically the Mountain Lu West Sea, located in Jiujiang) was the filming location for the fifteenth series of the American TV show Survivor.

Flora and fauna
The mountainous terrain and large forest coverage of Jiangxi has made it historically one of the more wild places of central China. South China tigers have been seen as recently as fifteen or twenty years ago and projects are underway to document evidence of existing tigers, if there are any. Several mountain areas along the northern border with Hunan and Hubei are potential sites for "wilderness" preserves specifically for protecting or even reintroducing tigers.

Other wildlife, though not plentiful, are more numerous in Jiangxi than in many other developed areas of China. Numerous species of birds are common, especially around the marshes of Lake Poyang in the north. Though protected, mammals such as muntjac, wild boar, civet cats, and pangolins, are still common enough that they'll even occasionally be seen in markets for sale as game meat, or possibly even in a forest.

The late Paleocene mesonychid, Jiangxia chaotoensis was found in the province, and named after it.

Education

Colleges and universities

List of colleges and universities in Jiangxi:
University of Jiujiang
Jiangxi College of Foreign Studies (江西外语外贸职业学院)
 East China University of Technology
 East China Jiaotong University
 Jiangxi Agricultural University
 Jiangxi Institute of Education
 Jiangxi Normal University
 Jiangxi Science and Technology Normal University
 Jiangxi University of Finance and Economics
 Jingdezhen Ceramic Institute
 Jinggangshan University
 Nanchang Institute of Technology
 Nanchang Hangkong University
 Nanchang University
 Xinyu University
 Yichun University

Sister provinces
 Bay of Plenty Region, New Zealand
 Okayama Prefecture, Japan
 Bohol, Philippines
 Hesse, Germany
 Kentucky, United States
 Mato Grosso do Sul, Brazil
 Sabah, Malaysia

See also

 Major national historical and cultural sites in Jiangxi

Notes

References

External links

 
  Jiangxi Government website 
 "Map of Jiangxi Province with Explanations" from 1573 CE - 1620 CE
 Economic profile for Jiangxi at HKTDC

 
Provinces of the People's Republic of China
East China